Freeland is an unincorporated community in Muskingum County, in the U.S. state of Ohio.

History
A post office was established at Freeland in 1874, and remained in operation until 1918. The post office was originally housed in a local store.

References

Unincorporated communities in Muskingum County, Ohio
1874 establishments in Ohio
Populated places established in 1874
Unincorporated communities in Ohio